Juan Pablo Medina (born October 22, 1977) is an American actor. He is best known for his portrayal of Ulises, the lead character on the TV Azteca drama series Drenaje profundo.

Biography
He began his career in the Mexican telenovela Cuando seas mía. He is a graduate of CEFAC, the acting school of Televisión Azteca, company for which he worked several years (2000-2013).

In July 2021, Medina was hospitalized for a venous thrombosis that necessitated the amputation of his right leg.

Selected filmography

Films

Television roles

References

External links 
 

1977 births
Living people
Mexican male actors
People from Arlington County, Virginia